Up the Junction is a 1968 British "kitchen sink" drama film, directed by Peter Collinson and starring Dennis Waterman, Suzy Kendall, Adrienne Posta, Maureen Lipman and Liz Fraser. It is based on the 1963 book of the same name by Nell Dunn and was adapted by Roger Smith. The film's soundtrack was by Manfred Mann. The film followed Ken Loach's BBC TV adaptation of 1965, but returned to the original book. It generated less controversy and impact than the Loach version.

Plot
The film is set in London in the 1960s and it begins with wealthy young heiress Polly Dean (Suzy Kendall) leaving a large house in privileged Chelsea in a chauffeur-driven Rolls-Royce. The Rolls-Royce then moves across the Thames near Battersea Power Station, where Polly gets out of the car and walks away alone with the opening credits following. She moves to a working-class community in Battersea, where she takes a job in Macrindles confectionery factory in an attempt to distance herself from her moneyed upbringing and make her own living. On the factory floor everyone is singing and all are friendly, but perhaps somewhat unhygienic - smoking as they work on the sweets. The other girls mainly discuss men and sex. She meets two working-class sisters, Sylvie (Maureen Lipman) and Rube (Adrienne Posta). She is asked to join the two sisters and a few other girls in the factory in the pub, The Pavilion. They get the local boys to buy them drinks. She declines a lift home on a motorbike. Some are heading "up the junction". But Polly walks home.

The next day Polly arrives at Clapham Junction railway station with a suitcase. She is finding a flat of her own. The agent thinks the flat is not good enough for her. She takes it anyway. She goes to the local market and buys a single banana, and eats it on a chair outside a junk shop. The assistant Pete (Dennis Waterman) tells her it is not a cafe but when the owner (Alfie Bass) comes out she says she needs furniture so he becomes more friendly. She buys an armchair and a sofa... and also finds a kitten. Pete gives her a lift back to her flat and unloads the furniture. He asks her on a date. He presumes she wants to go to the West End but she says she wants to walk around the streets of Battersea. Polly and Pete then kiss and begin their relationship.

Rube becomes pregnant from her boyfriend Terry (Michael Gothard) and has a traumatic illegal abortion from a slightly senile old woman called Winnie (Hylda Baker). Rube's mother doesn't know about her pregnancy or her abortion but when she and Polly get home, Polly tells Rube's mother. Furious with Terry, she pushes him down the stairs when he comes over while Rube is screaming upstairs from her miscarriage. Meanwhile, Pete is annoyed with Rube and Sylvie and doesn't help Sylvie when she is attacked by her husband from whom she is separated. Tragedy then strikes when Terry is killed in a motorcycle accident.

Polly and Pete go on a trip to the seaside, travelling by an E-type Jaguar that Pete tells Polly he has hired for the weekend. They argue in their hotel, it becoming clear that Pete envies Polly's access to an easy life, and is frustrated by her rejection of a wealthy lifestyle. His argument with her points out her ability to choose, whereas most people do not have this choice. The argument ends the relationship. He storms off and is caught speeding in the Jaguar which, it transpires, was stolen.

In court Polly and her friends see Pete sentenced to six months' imprisonment. Polly pulls strings to see him in the lock-up for a final word before he is driven away to jail. The film ends with Polly crying while she watches Pete being driven away.

Cast
 Suzy Kendall as Polly
 Dennis Waterman as Pete
 Maureen Lipman as Sylvie
 Adrienne Posta as Rube
 Liz Fraser as Mrs. McCarthy
 Linda Cole as Pauline
 Doreen Herrington as Rita
 Jessie Robins as Lil
 Barbara Archer as May
 Ruby Head as Edith
 Susan George as Joyce
 Sandra Williams as Sheilah
 Michael Robbins as Figgins
 Michael Gothard as Terry
 Billy Murray as Ray
 Michael Standing as John
 Alfie Bass as Charlie
 Aubrey Morris as Creely
 Hylda Baker as Winnie
 Shaun Curry as Ted
 Olwen Griffiths as Fat Lil
 Queenie Watts as Mrs. Hardy
 Lockwood West as Magistrate
 Michael Barrington as Barrister
 Yvonne Manners as Hotel Receptionist
 Harry Hutchinson as Hotel Porter
 Larry Martyn as Barrow Boy
 Derek Ware as Ted's Friend
 Mike Reid as Policeman outside courtroom (uncredited)

Production

Filming locations
The film was shot in the Battersea area of London. Polly's flat is 86 Ingrave Street and the seaside scenes are filmed in Worthing, Sussex.

Critical reception
In The New York Times, Renata Adler wrote of "the latest in the series of British working-class color films that seem to come from British directors with the regularity of episodes from "Our Gal Sunday," and it is by far the best of them. A lot of things are wrong with it, but a lot is going for it, too." Of the performances, she singled out the "very talented" Suzy Kendall in a challenging role, "a really beautiful piece of characterization by Dennis Waterman," and "strong" support from Adrienne Posta, Maureen Lipman and Michael Gothard. Peter Collinson's direction was also noted for his "well-shot scenes of Battersea and of the candy factory."

Box Office
According to Kinematograph Weekly, there were four British films in the top ten general releases of the year: Up the Junction, Poor Cow, Here We Go Round the Mulberry Bush and Carry on Doctor.

References

External links
 
 

1968 films
1968 drama films
British drama films
Films directed by Peter Collinson
Social realism in film
Films set in London
Films produced by Anthony Havelock-Allan
Films about abortion
1960s English-language films
1960s British films